The India cricket team toured South Africa from December 2021 and January 2022 to play three Tests and three One Day International (ODI) matches. The Test matches formed part of the 2021–2023 ICC World Test Championship.

India won the first Test by 113 runs, to win their first-ever Test match at Centurion Park. It was also Quinton de Kock's final Test match, after he announced his retirement from Test cricket with immediate effect following the conclusion of the match. South Africa won the second Test by seven wickets to level the series. It was the first time that South Africa had beaten India in a Test match at the Wanderers Stadium. South Africa won the third and final Test, also by seven wickets, to win the series 2–1. The day after the end of the third match, Virat Kohli announced that he had stepped down as India's captain in Test cricket.

South Africa won the first ODI match by 31 runs, with an unbeaten century by Rassie van der Dussen. South Africa won the second ODI by seven wickets to win the series with a match to spare. South Africa won the final ODI by four runs, winning the series 3–0.

Background
In November 2021, Cricket South Africa confirmed that due to restrictions in Johannesburg, the third Test had been moved from the Wanderers Stadium to the Newlands Cricket Ground. Due to a new variant of COVID-19 detected in Southern Africa, a Board of Control for Cricket in India (BCCI) official stated that it would re-evaluating whether the series will be held once they "get a detailed picture of the ground situation from Cricket South Africa." On 2 December 2021, India's Test captain Virat Kohli said that the team would have "absolute clarity" regarding the tour in "a day or two or pretty soon". On 4 December 2021, both boards agreed to a new tour schedule, starting slightly later than originally planned. On 6 December 2021, the new tour schedule was confirmed. The tour was also scheduled to include four Twenty20 International (T20I) matches, but these were postponed, with Cricket South Africa saying these would be "rescheduled for a more opportune time". On 20 December 2021, both cricket boards agreed to play the tour behind closed doors, following an increase in COVID-19 cases.

Squads

In December 2021, it was announced that South Africa's Quinton de Kock would miss at least the third Test of the tour due to him taking paternity leave. Anrich Nortje was ruled out of South Africa's squad for the Test series due to a hip injury. On 30 December 2021, Quinton de Kock announced his retirement from Test cricket with immediate effect, ruling him out of the second and third Tests. On 2 January 2022, Cricket South Africa announced a 17-member squad for the ODI series, with Marco Jansen receiving his maiden ODI call-up. Kagiso Rabada was released from South Africa's ODI squad to manage his workload, with George Linde being retained from their Test squad for the ODI series.

India also named Navdeep Saini, Saurabh Kumar, Deepak Chahar and Arzan Nagwaswalla as standby players in their Test squad. Rohit Sharma was ruled out of India's squad for the Test matches due to an injury, with Priyank Panchal named as his replacement. On 18 December 2021, KL Rahul was named as the vice-captain of India's Test squad for the series, replacing Rohit Sharma. Ahead of the tour, Rohit Sharma was named as the captain of India's ODI squad, replacing Virat Kohli. On 31 December 2021, India's ODI squad was announced with Rohit Sharma ruled out of the series. KL Rahul was named as the ODI captain for the series. Ahead of the ODI series, Washington Sundar was ruled out of India's squad following a positive test for COVID-19, with Jayant Yadav named as his replacement. Navdeep Saini was also added to India's ODI squad, as cover for Mohammed Siraj.

Test series

1st Test

2nd Test

3rd Test

ODI series

1st ODI

2nd ODI

3rd ODI

Notes

References

External links
 Series home at ESPN Cricinfo

2021 in Indian cricket
2021 in South African cricket
International cricket competitions in 2021–22
Indian cricket tours of South Africa
Cricket events curtailed due to the COVID-19 pandemic